The Crusade of 1101 was a minor crusade of three separate movements, organized in 1100 and 1101 in the successful aftermath of the First Crusade. It is also called the Crusade of the Faint-Hearted due to the number of participants who joined this crusade after having turned back from the First Crusade.

Calls for reinforcements from the newly established Kingdom of Jerusalem, and Pope Paschal II, successor to Pope Urban II (who died before learning of the outcome of the crusade that he had called), urged a new expedition. He especially urged those who had taken the crusade vow but had never departed, and those who had turned back while on the march. Some of these people were already scorned at home and faced enormous pressure to return to the east; Adela of Blois, wife of Stephen, Count of Blois, who had fled from the siege of Antioch in 1098, was so ashamed of her husband that she would not permit him to stay at home.

Lombards 

As in the first crusade, the pilgrims and soldiers did not leave as a part of one large army, but rather in several groups from various different regions from across Western Europe. In September 1100, a large group of Lombards left from Milan. These were mostly untrained peasants, led by Anselm IV, Archbishop of Milan. When they reached the territory of the Byzantine Empire, they pillaged it recklessly, and Byzantine emperor Alexios I escorted them to a camp outside Constantinople. This did not satisfy them, and they made their way inside the city where they pillaged the Blachernae palace, even killing Alexios' pet lion. The Lombards were quickly ferried across the Bosporus and made their camp at Nicomedia, to wait for reinforcements.

At Nicomedia they were joined in May 1101 by a smaller but stronger contingent of French, Burgundians, and Germans, under Stephen of Blois, Stephen I, Count of Burgundy, Eudes I, Duke of Burgundy, and Conrad, constable of Henry IV, Holy Roman Emperor. Joining them at Nicomedia was Raymond IV of Toulouse, one of the leaders of the First Crusade who was now in the service of the emperor. He was appointed overall leader, and a Byzantine force of Pecheneg mercenaries was sent out with them under the command of General Tzitas. 
This group marched out at the end of May, towards Dorylaeum, following the route taken by Raymond and Stephen in 1097 during the First Crusade. They planned to continue towards Iconium but the Lombards, whose rabble outnumbered all the other contingents, were determined to march north to Niksar where Bohemond I of Antioch was being held captive by the Danishmends. After capturing Ancyra on 23 June 1101 and returning it to Alexios, the crusaders turned north. They briefly besieged the heavily garrisoned city of Gangra, and then continued north to attempt to capture the Turkish-controlled city of Kastamonu (Kastamone). However, they came under attack from the Seljuq Turks who harassed them for weeks, and a foraging party was destroyed in July.

At this point, under the threats of the Lombards, the entire army turned away from the possible safety of the Black Sea coast and again moved east, toward Danishmend territory and the rescue of Bohemond. However, the Seljuqs, under Kilij Arslan I, realizing that disunity was the cause of their inability to stop the First Crusade, had now allied with both the Danishmends and Ridwan of Aleppo. In early August the crusaders met this combined Muslim army at Mersivan.

Battle of Mersivan
At the Battle of Mersivan, the crusaders were organized into five divisions: the Burgundians, Raymond and the Byzantines, the Germans, the French, and the Lombards. The Turks nearly destroyed the crusaders’ army near the mountains of Paphlagonia at Mersivan. The land was well-suited to the Turks—dry and inhospitable for their enemy, it was open, with plenty of space for their cavalry units. The Turks had been troublesome to the Latins for some days, at last making certain that they went where Kilij Arslan I wanted them to be and making sure that they only found a small amount of supplies.

The battle took place over several days. On the first day, the Turks cut off the crusading armies’ advances and surrounded them. The next day, Conrad led his Germans in a raid that failed miserably. Not only did they fail to open the Turkish lines, they were unable to return to the main crusader army and had to take refuge in a nearby stronghold. This meant that they were cut off from supplies, aid, and communication for an attack that may have taken place had the Germans been able to provide their own military strength.

The third day was somewhat quiet, with little or no serious fighting taking place, but on the fourth day, the crusaders made an intensive effort to free themselves from the trap that they were in. The crusaders inflicted heavy losses on the Turks, but the attack was a failure by the end of the day. Kilij Arslan was joined by Ridwan of Aleppo and other powerful Danishmend princes.

The Lombards, in the vanguard, were defeated, the Pechenegs deserted, and the French and Germans were also forced to fall back. Raymond was trapped on a rock and was rescued by Stephen and Conrad. The battle continued into the next day, when the crusader camp was captured and the knights fled, leaving women, children, and priests behind to be killed or enslaved. Most of the Lombards, who had no horses, were soon found and killed or enslaved by the Turks. Raymond, Stephen of Blois, and Stephen of Burgundy fled north to Sinope, and returned to Constantinople by ship.

The Nivernois
Soon after the Lombard contingent had left Nicomedia, a separate force under William II of Nevers arrived at Constantinople. He had crossed into Byzantine territory over the Adriatic Sea from Bari, and the march to Constantinople was free of incident, an unusual occurrence for a crusade army. He quickly marched out to meet the others, but in fact never caught up with them, although the two armies must have been close to each other on numerous occasions. William briefly besieged Iconium (Konya) but could not take it, and he was soon ambushed at Heraclea Cybistra by Kilij Arslan, who had just defeated the Lombards at Mersivan and was eager to stamp out these new armies as soon as possible. At Heraclea almost the entire contingent from Nevers was wiped out, except for the count himself and a few of his men.

The French and Bavarians
As soon as William II left Constantinople, a third army arrived, led by William IX of Aquitaine, Hugh of Vermandois (one of those who had not fulfilled his vow on the First Crusade), and Welf I, Duke of Bavaria; accompanying them was Ida of Austria, mother of Leopold III of Austria. They had pillaged Byzantine territory on the way to Constantinople and had almost come into conflict with the Pecheneg mercenaries sent to stop them, until William and Welf intervened.

From Constantinople, the Aquitanian-Bavarian army split in two, with one half travelling directly to Jaffa by ship; among them was the chronicler Ekkehard of Aura. The rest, travelling by land, reached Heraclea in September, and, like the previous army, were ambushed and massacred by Kilij Arslan. William and Welf escaped, but Hugh was mortally wounded; the survivors eventually arrived at Tarsus, where Hugh died on 18 October. Ida disappeared during this ambush and was presumably killed, but according to later legend she was taken into captivity and became the mother of Zengi, a great enemy of the crusaders in the 1140s, which - however - is impossible due to chronological factors.

Aftermath
William of Nevers also escaped to Tarsus and joined the rest of the survivors there as did Raymond of Toulouse. Under Raymond's command they captured Tortosa (Tartous), with help from a Genoese fleet. By now the crusade was more of a pilgrimage. The survivors arrived at Antioch at the end of 1101, and at Easter in 1102 arrived in Jerusalem. Afterwards, many of them simply went home, their vow having been fulfilled, although some remained behind to help King Baldwin I defend against an Egyptian invasion at Ramla. Stephen of Blois was killed during this battle, as was Hugh VI of Lusignan, ancestor of the future Lusignan dynasty of Jerusalem and Cyprus. Joscelin of Courtenay also stayed behind, and survived to become Count of Edessa in 1118.

The defeat of the crusaders allowed Kilij Arslan to establish his capital at Iconium, and also proved to the Muslim world that the crusaders were not invincible, as they appeared to be during the First Crusade. The crusaders and Byzantines each blamed the other for the defeat, and neither of them were able to ensure a safe route through Anatolia now that Kilij Arslan had strengthened his position. The only open route to the Holy Land was the sea route, which benefitted the Italian maritime republics. The lack of a safe land route from Constantinople also benefitted the Principality of Antioch, where Tancred, ruling for his uncle Bohemond, was able to consolidate his power without Byzantine interference.

Both the Second and Third Crusades suffered similar difficulties when attempting to cross Anatolia.

References

Further reading

Primary sources
Albert of Aix, Historia Hierosolymitana

Secondary sources

 
Conflicts in 1101
1101 in Asia
1100s in the Kingdom of Jerusalem
1100s in the Byzantine Empire
12th-century crusades
12th century in the Seljuk Empire